Oaro is a settlement close to the Pacific Ocean Coast of north Canterbury, in the South Island of New Zealand.

Oaro is within Kaikoura District on State Highway 1 and on the South Island Main Trunk railway, 20 kilometres south of Kaikoura. It lies on a small flood plain close to the mouth of the Oaro River, which reaches the ocean just to the north of Oaro. The headland of Piripaua (Spyglass Point) and the associated Haumuri Bluff are located just to the south of the settlement.

There is some conjecture about Oaro's etymology, though it is definitely Māori; it has been suggested that it could mean "the place at the front", "the place of swamp", or "the place of a wish". Alternatively it could mean "The place of Aro", which may have been the name of a prominent local Māori individual.

The area around Oaro was badly affected by the 2016 Kaikoura earthquake.

References

Kaikōura District
Populated places in Canterbury, New Zealand